Self-portrait at an Easel or Self-portrait in the Studio is a 1790-1795 cabinet-format portrait by Francisco de Goya, now in the Real Academia de Bellas Artes de San Fernando. 

This self-portrait, in addition to its simply resplendent beauty, is a clear and articulate commentary on the Romantic artist. 

Goya finds it unnecessary to look at the canvas while he paints; inspiration alone guides his brush. Goya stands aside, is indeed enveloped by, a grandly lit window like the one that serves as a metaphor for Christ's holiness in Leonardo da Vinci's Last Supper, and moreover, one through which the natural world is decidedly not visible. The art historian, John J. Ciofalo, writes: "with thick coats of radiant white paint, Goya has literally and figuratively brushed "the outside world" out of existence or, at a minimum, demoted it to irrelevance."

To underscore this, Goya has no need, and yet is wearing his night painting hat, affixed with a "halo" of candles to crown his Romantic imagination. In short, as Ciofalo writes, "that is not daylight coming in the window...the radiance is coming from inside the studio, from inside the Romantic artist's mind."

See also
List of works by Francisco Goya

References

External links

Paintings in the collection of the Real Academia de Bellas Artes de San Fernando
1795 paintings
Self-portraits
Portraits by Francisco Goya